The 14th High School in Wrocław (XIV Liceum Ogólnokształcące we Wrocławiu) is a public high school in Wrocław, Poland, part of the 14th School Complex, that also incorporates the 49th Bilingual Junior High School. The school for many years has been placed in top spots of various Polish rankings assessing pupils achievements.

History 

The school was established in 1974, as a result of a division in the 3rd High School in Wrocław. It was first situated by the Szczytnicka street, and its first headmaster was Aleksander Dobrzycki. At first, classes were taught just in a math-physics curriculum, but in 1977, a chemical class was introduced. In 1990, a theatrical class came as well, but it ceased to operate in 2000. In the same year, a humanistic class was set. Before that, in 1992, a bilingual class was created. In 1983, the school became part of the Creative Schools Society. In 2000, the 49th Bilingual Junior High School was created, too.

In 2002, the location of the school changed to the Bruckner street. The 14th School Complex was established that incorporated the said high school and junior high, as well as a technical school and a profiled high school (the two latter ended its existence in 2004). In 2005, after 30 years of command, Aleksander Dobrzycki left the school and Marek Łaźniak took his place.

Since the school year 2006–07, there are four university classes: mathematics, computer science, chemistry and humanities. Some activities are being conducted in forms of lectures by professors of the University of Wrocław.

External links 

Education in Wrocław
Educational institutions established in 1974
1974 establishments in Poland